The Islamic Group is a Sunni Islamist political party in Lebanon. Jamaa Islamiya was founded in 1964 as the Lebanese branch of the Muslim Brotherhood. In fact, it was established by young members of 'Ibad al Rahman (or the Worshipers of the Merciful). Its origins, as documented by Nizar Hamzeh, go back to the height of Gamal Abdel Nasser's efforts at Arab unity in the mid-1960s. It supports the idea of establishing a legal order in Lebanon that is based on Islamic shari'a. As a local branch it closely follows the doctrines of the Muslim Brotherhood. Fathi Yakan was the group's grandfather and main ideologue who is a veteran Islamist scholar and preacher from Tripoli.

Its ex-leader is Ibrahim Al-Masri, who succeeded its former leader Faisal Mawlawi due to sickness. Lately, it entered the 2009 Lebanese general election beside the Future Movement in Beirut's 3rd electoral district. Currently they have 1 seat in the Lebanese Parliament.

See also
Hezbollah
Lebanese Civil War
Islamic Unification Movement

References

External links
Islamic Group official site

1964 establishments in Lebanon
Conservative parties in Lebanon
Islamic political parties in Lebanon
March 14 Alliance
Muslim Brotherhood
Political parties established in 1964
Political parties in Lebanon
Islamic organizations established in 1964